Geranium is a ghost town in Valley County, Nebraska, in the United States.

History
A post office was established at Geranium in 1879, and remained in operation until it was discontinued in 1905. The town was named after the Geranium species of flowering plants.

References

Geography of Valley County, Nebraska